Georgina Anne Lee (born 14 August 1981) is a female English former competitive swimmer.

Swimming career
Lee represented Great Britain in the Olympics and European championships, and competed for England in the Commonwealth Games.

Lee won gold, silver, and bronze medals at the 2002 Commonwealth Games. She was also a bronze medallist at the European SC Championships in 2001.

Lee represented Great Britain at both the 2000 Summer Olympics in Sydney and the 2004 Summer Olympics in Athens. In Sydney she reached the semifinal in the 200-metre butterfly, breaking the British Record and finishing in 10th place. In Athens she reached the semifinal in the 200-metre butterfly, again finishing in 10th place, and she reached the final in both the 4×100-metre medley relay and the 4×200-metre freestyle relay. She also competed in the 100-metre butterfly but did not progress beyond the heats.

Lee set 14 British records between 2000 and 2004, and at the ASA National British Championships she won the 100 metres butterfly title in 2001, 2002 and 2004 and the 200 metres butterfly title in 2000, 2001, 2002 and 2004.

Attending Southern Methodist University in Dallas, Texas, between 2001 and 2004, Lee won two titles at the U.S. National Championships in 2003. She was also champion and runner-up at the NCAA national collegiate championships, and she was awarded an NCAA postgraduate scholarship upon graduation.

Personal life
Lee was born the youngest of 6 children and was educated at King Edward VI High School For Girls in Birmingham. In 1999 her father, Malcolm Lee, died from a heart attack. In 2003 her brother, Adrian Lee, died in a suspected suicide from an overdose of prescribed pills for depression.  Lee did not talk publicly about her brother's death until a year later, when she gave an interview in April 2004 to Craig Lord of The Times.

References

External links
British Swimming athlete profile
Camp Hill Edwardians Swimming Club
Southern Methodist University Women's Swimming

1981 births
Living people
Sportspeople from Birmingham, West Midlands
People educated at King Edward VI High School for Girls, Birmingham
English female swimmers
Olympic swimmers of Great Britain
Swimmers at the 2000 Summer Olympics
Swimmers at the 2004 Summer Olympics
Swimmers at the 1998 Commonwealth Games
Swimmers at the 2002 Commonwealth Games
Commonwealth Games gold medallists for England
Commonwealth Games silver medallists for England
Commonwealth Games bronze medallists for England
English female freestyle swimmers
Female butterfly swimmers
SMU Mustangs women's swimmers
Commonwealth Games medallists in swimming
20th-century English women
21st-century English women
Medallists at the 2002 Commonwealth Games